Svetlana Vladimirovna Krivelyova (born 13 June 1969) is a former track and field athlete who specialised in the shot put.

Krivelyova was born in Bryansk, Russia. Her career highlights were the Summer Olympics gold medal in 1992 whilst representing the Unified Team, where she beat the reigning world champion Huang Zhihong of China, and her World Championship victory in 2003.

Her most unlikely victory came at the 2004 World Indoor Championships. She was awarded the gold medal after Ukraine's Vita Pavlysh was stripped of her title for failing a drug test. This was the second time Pavlysh was found to have taken anabolic steroids and lost a World indoor title; she was subsequently banned from athletics for life.

Despite being world ranked number 1 in the run up to the 2004 Summer Olympics in Athens, Greece, Krivelyova could only manage to finish fourth to match her finish at the 2000 Summer Olympics. However the winner, compatriot Irina Korzhanenko, tested positive for Stanozolol and was stripped of her title, promoting Krivelyova to the bronze medal position.

The IOC retested the samples from the 2004 Olympics and diagnosed a positive test. Krivelyova lost her third place to Nadzeya Ostapchuk (the bronze medal was not awarded). In April 2013, she was banned from competitions for two years.

International competitions

National titles
Russian Athletics Championships
Shot put: 1992, 1998, 1999, 2000, 2002, 2003
Russian Indoor Athletics Championships
Shot put: 1993, 2003
Soviet Athletics Championships
Shot put: 1991
Soviet Indoor Athletics Championships
Shot put: 1991

See also
List of doping cases in athletics
List of Olympic medalists in athletics (women)
List of 1992 Summer Olympics medal winners
List of 2004 Summer Olympics medal winners
List of stripped Olympic medals
List of World Athletics Championships medalists (women)
List of IAAF World Indoor Championships medalists (women)
List of European Athletics Championships medalists (women)
List of Russian sportspeople
List of Russian people
Doping in Russia
Doping at the World Athletics Championships
Doping at the Olympic Games
Russia at the World Athletics Championships

References 

1969 births
Living people
Sportspeople from Bryansk
Russian female shot putters
Soviet female shot putters
Olympic female shot putters
Olympic athletes of Russia
Olympic athletes of the Unified Team
Olympic gold medalists for the Unified Team
Olympic gold medalists in athletics (track and field)
Athletes (track and field) at the 1992 Summer Olympics
Athletes (track and field) at the 1996 Summer Olympics
Athletes (track and field) at the 2000 Summer Olympics
Athletes (track and field) at the 2004 Summer Olympics
Medalists at the 1992 Summer Olympics
Competitors stripped of Summer Olympics medals
Universiade gold medalists in athletics (track and field)
Universiade gold medalists for the Soviet Union
Medalists at the 1991 Summer Universiade
Competitors at the 2001 Goodwill Games
World Athletics Championships athletes for Russia
World Athletics Championships medalists
World Athletics Championships winners
World Athletics Indoor Championships winners
European Athletics Championships medalists
Soviet Athletics Championships winners
Russian Athletics Championships winners
Doping cases in athletics
Russian sportspeople in doping cases
Russian State University of Physical Education, Sport, Youth and Tourism alumni